Vinton Township is one of the twelve townships of Vinton County, Ohio, United States.  The 2010 census found 548 people in the township.

Geography
Located in the southern part of the county, it borders the following townships:
Madison Township: north
Knox Township: northeast
Columbia Township, Meigs County: east
Salem Township, Meigs County: southeast corner
Wilkesville Township: south
Milton Township, Jackson County: southwest
Clinton Township: west
Elk Township: northwest corner

No municipalities are located in Vinton Township, although the unincorporated community of Oreton lies in the township's west.

Name and history
Like the county in which it is contained, Vinton Township was named for Samuel Finley Vinton.

It is the only Vinton Township statewide.

Government
The township is governed by a three-member board of trustees, who are elected in November of odd-numbered years to a four-year term beginning on the following January 1. Two are elected in the year after the presidential election and one is elected in the year before it. There is also an elected township fiscal officer, who serves a four-year term beginning on April 1 of the year after the election, which is held in November of the year before the presidential election. Vacancies in the fiscal officership or on the board of trustees are filled by the remaining trustees.

References

External links
Vinton County Chamber of Commerce 

Townships in Vinton County, Ohio
Townships in Ohio